The Writers' Union of Kazakhstan is a Kazakh literary organization, established in the 1930s. Since its inception at least 750 of Kazakhstan's top writers have been affiliated with the union.

Presidents
 Säken Seifullin, 1925–1929, founder
 İlias Jansügırov, 1932-1935
 Ğabbas Toğjanov, 1935-1936
 Säbit Mūqanov, 1936–1937, 1943-1951
 Mūhamedjan Qarataev, 1937-1938
 Dihan Äbılev, 1938-1939
 Äbdılda Täjıbaev, 1939-1943
 Äbdırahim Jaimurzin, 1951-1953
 Ğabiden Mūstafin, 1953–1956, 1962-1964
 Ğabit Mūsırepov, 1956–1962, 1964-1966
 Ädi Şärıpov, 1966-1971
 Änuar Älımjanov 1971-1979
 Jūban Moldağaliev, 1979-1983
 Oljas Süleimenov, 1983-1991
 Qaldarbek Naimanbaiev, 1991-1996
 Nūrlan Orazalin, 1996-2018
 Ūlyqbek Esdäulet, 2018-current

1930s establishments in the Kazakh Autonomous Socialist Soviet Republic
Arts organizations established in the 1930s
Kazakhstani literature
Cultural organizations based in Kazakhstan
Kazakhstan